AP20187 is a ligand that can induce homodimerization of fusion proteins containing the F36V mutant of an FKBP domain(FKBPF36V), available commercially as the DmrB domain.

References

Dimers (chemistry)
Ligands (biochemistry)